The 2022 Greenwich London Borough Council election took place on 5 May 2022. All 55 members of Greenwich London Borough Council will be elected. The elections will take place alongside local elections in the other London boroughs and elections to local authorities across the United Kingdom.

In the previous election in 2018, the Labour Party maintained its longstanding control of the council, winning 42 out of the 51 seats with the Conservative Party forming the council opposition with the remaining 9 seats. The 2022 election will take place under new election boundaries, which will increase the number of councillors to 55.

Background

History 

The thirty-two London boroughs were established in 1965 by the London Government Act 1963. They are the principal authorities in Greater London and have responsibilities including education, housing, planning, highways, social services, libraries, recreation, waste, environmental health and revenue collection. Some of the powers are shared with the Greater London Authority, which also manages passenger transport, police and fire.

Since its formation, Greenwich has been continuously under Labour control except for the period from 1968 to 1971 when it was under Conservative control. Councillors have been elected from the Labour Party, Conservative Party, Liberal Democrats and the Social Democratic Party. The Liberal Democrats lost their most recent seats in the 2010 election with all seats since being won by Labour or the Conservatives. In the most recent election in 2018, Labour won 42 seats with 55.9% of the vote and the Conservatives won 9 seats with 23.6% of the vote. The Liberal Democrats received 8.6% of the vote and the Green Party received 7.7% of the vote, but neither party won any seats. The incumbent leader of the council is the Labour councillor Danny Thorpe, who has held that position since 2018.

Council term 
A Labour councillor for Glyndon, Tonia Ashikodi, was given a suspended sentence for property fraud in March 2020. She resigned on the same day. She had declared she had no other property when she became a council tenant in 2008 and repeated the claim in 2012, while owning three rental homes. Due to the ongoing COVID-19 pandemic, it was not possible to hold a by-election until May 2021.

In April 2020, a Labour councillor for Kidbrooke with Hornfair, Christine Grice, died. She had served on the council since 2014 and had been elected as deputy leader shortly before her death. The council's finance cabinet member and a Labour councillor for Shooters Hill, Chris Kirby, announced his resignation in January 2021. He was moving with his family to the Peak District. A Labour councillor for Greenwich West, Mehboob Khan, announced his resignation in February 2021 due to taking a politically restricted job working for Redbridge London Borough Council. He had previously been the leader of Kirklees Council in Yorkshire, remaining a councillor there for some time after moving to Greenwich  and had served on Greenwich council since 2015

By-elections to fill all vacancies were held in May 2021 alongside the 2021 London mayoral election and London Assembly election. Labour held all four seats, with Sandra Bauer winning in Glyndon, Odette McGahey winning in Kidbrooke with Hornfair, Clare Burke-McDonald winning in Shooters Hill and Pat Slattery winning in Greenwich West 

Along with most other London boroughs, Greenwich was subject to a boundary review ahead of the 2022 election. The Local Government Boundary Commission for England concluded that the council should have 55 seats, an increase of four, and produced new election boundaries following a period of consultation. The new scheme consists of nine three-councillor wards and fourteen two-councillor wards.

Electoral process 
Greenwich, like other London borough councils, elects all of its councillors at once every four years. The previous election took place in 2018. The election will take place by multi-member first-past-the-post voting, with each ward being represented by two or three councillors. Electors will have as many votes as there are councillors to be elected in their ward, with the top two or three being elected.

All registered electors (British, Irish, Commonwealth and European Union citizens) living in London aged 18 or over will be entitled to vote in the election. People who live at two addresses in different councils, such as university students with different term-time and holiday addresses, are entitled to be registered for and vote in elections in both local authorities. Voting in-person at polling stations will take place from 7:00 to 22:00 on election day, and voters will be able to apply for postal votes or proxy votes in advance of the election.

Previous council composition

Results summary

Ward results

References 

Greenwich